The 1918–19 Hong Kong First Division League season was the 11th since its establishment.

League table

References
1918–19 Hong Kong First Division table (RSSSF)
香港倒後鏡blog

1918-19
1918–19 domestic association football leagues
1918 in Hong Kong
1919 in Hong Kong